This is a list of characters from the television series Kud puklo da puklo (Whichever Way the Ball Bounces), a Croatian comedy telenovela produced by Nova TV.

Main characters
List of "Kud puklo da puklo" main characters

Review of main characters

Recurring characters
List of "Kud puklo da puklo" recurring characters

Review of recurring characters

Kud puklo da puklo
Croatian comedy television series